Cromwell Racecourse Aerodrome  is a small airport 1 Nautical Mile (1.9 km) to the west of Cromwell township in Central Otago in the South Island of New Zealand.  The aerodrome is located on the boundary of the Cromwell Racecourse which is used for horse racing and adjacent to Cromwell Hospital.

Operational information:
No runway lighting
Runway strength ESWL 3630
Circuit: RWY 36 - right hand RWY 18/27 - left hand 
Circuit Height: 1800 ft AMSL 
Runway 09: Landing Prohibited
Runway 27: Take-off prohibited

Sources 
NZAIP Volume 4 AD
New Zealand AIP

Airports in New Zealand
Transport buildings and structures in Otago